ČT24 (Czech pronunciation: ˈtʃeːteːˈdvatsɛtˈt͡ʃtɪr̝ɪ) is a 24-hour news channel in Czech, owned and operated by Czech Television. The channel was launched on 2 May 2005.

ČT24 broadcasts from Prague, Czech Republic, where their headquarters is, but ČT24 also has branches and broadcasts from Brno and Ostrava.

Broadcast 
ČT24 broadcasts live over the internet, as well as over the satellites Astra 3B and Intelsat 10-02. It is also carried on Czech cable-TV providers and digital terrestrial services.

HD
High-definition (HD) broadcasting via satellite was started on 1 November 2016 using Astra 3B-capacities.

Logos

Format 
ČT24 airs a short news bulletin every hour, on the hour. This channel also airs many other shows including 90' ČT24,  Hyde Park Civilizace, Veda 24, Horizont ČT24, Interview ČT24, Studio 6, Newsroom ČT24, Studio ČT24, Branky, body, vteřiny, Týden v kultuře, Události, Události, komentáře, Události v kultuře, Události v regionech, Týden v regionech, Zprávy v 12, Zprávy v 16, Zprávy v 23 and Předpověď počasí.

References

External links

 Official website
 Twitter
 Facebook
 Instagram

Television stations in the Czech Republic
24-hour television news channels
Television channels and stations established in 2005
Czech-language television stations
Czech Television